Gateway is an unincorporated community in Jefferson County, Oregon, United States. It is located about 16 miles east of Warm Springs.

Gateway was named for a depression in the terrain north of Madras formed by the erosion of Trout Creek and its tributaries, which created a natural gateway for north–south railroad and vehicular traffic through Central Oregon. The name Gateway was applied to the post office at this locale in 1913. The post office, which was established about three miles from present-day Gateway, was originally called Youngs after local resident Louis A. Young. Gateway post office closed in 1956. The Proprietor of the Store and Post Office was Noah Vibbert.

The station on the Oregon Trunk Railway in Gateway was also known as Galloway (not to be confused with the post office of the same name in Morrow County). Today the rail line is owned by the BNSF Railway.

At one time the community had a school, a church, a railroad depot, and a store.

References

External links
Historic images of Gateway from Salem Public Library
1931 image of Gateway
Images of Gateway from Flickr

Unincorporated communities in Jefferson County, Oregon
1913 establishments in Oregon
Unincorporated communities in Oregon